Chiantla is a town and municipality in the Guatemalan department of Huehuetenango. The municipality is situated at 2,000 metres above sea level and covers an area of 521 km2. The annual festival is on January 28.

History

Mercedarian doctrine

After the Spanish conquest of Guatemala in the 1520s, the "Presentación de Guatemala" Mercedarian province was formed in 1565; originally, the order of the Blessed Virgin Mary of Mercy had gotten from bishop Francisco Marroquín several doctrines in the Sacatepéquez and Chimaltenango valleys, close to the capital Santiago de los Caballeros de Guatemala, but they traded those with the Order of Preachers friars in exchange for the doctrines those had in the Sierra de los Cuchumatanes area. During the first part of the 17th century they also had doctrine in four town close to the city of Santiago, which eventually became city neighborhoods: Espíritu Santo, Santiago, San Jerónimo and San Anton —which was the capital of the Mercedarians, where they had their convent and where their comendador lived.

According to bishop Juan de las Cabezas memoir in 1613 and the bishop Pedro Cortés y Larraz parish visit minutes from 1770, the Mercedarians came to have nine doctrines, and numerous annexes, which were: Santa Ana de Malacatán, Concepción de Huehuetenango, San Pedro de Solomá, Nuestra Señora de la Purificación de Jacaltenango, Nuestra Señora de la Candelaria de Chiantla, San Andrés de Cuilco, Santiago de Tejutla, San Pedro de Sacatepéquez, and San Juan de Ostuncalco.

However, in 1754, due to the borbon reforms implemented by the Spanish kings, the Mercedarins -and the rest of the regular clergy for that matter-, had to transfer their doctrines to the secular clergy, thus losing their Chiantla convent and annexed doctrines.

Climate

At an altitude of approximately 2000m, Chiantla has a climate similar to that of Antigua, though with the extra 600m above sea level it is often a little chillier in the night. The rainy season is from May to October, with mornings starting out warm and humid, followed by heavy rains - and even hail - in the afternoons, which usually dissipate by evening.

Population
The inhabitants of the city are mostly ladino, it is common to hear the languages of Popti, Canjobal, Chuj, and Mam being spoken by street venders, shoppers and residents.

Economy

Mining
Lead production was noted in the area in 1850. Modern exploration of the Chiantla mining district by Firestone Ventures, a Canadian firm headquartered in Edmonton, has produced a promising prospect for a lead, zinc, silver open pit mine at its Torlon Hill Zinc-Lead-Silver Project west of Chiantla at the site of the Cinco Hermanos workings.
Photos of the Torlon HIll Zinc project

Climate

Chiantla has a subtropical highland climate (Köppen: Cwb).

Geographic location 

Chiantla is almost completely surrounded by Huehuetenango Department municipalities.  The city of Chiantla is located within the Northwest sector of the department of Huehuetenango. It sits in the mountainside above the city of Huehuetenango, approximately 2 hours from the Mexican border.

See also
 
 
 List of places in Guatemala

Notes and references

References

Bibliography

External links
Site of Chiantla Spanish
Site of Education Chiantla, Génesis
Map showing relationship of Chiantla to the Pan American Highway and the Torlon Hill zinc project

 
Municipalities of the Huehuetenango Department